"Natural" is the seventh and final single from English singer Peter Andre's second studio album, Natural (1996). The song was released on 24 February 1997 through Mushroom Records and was heavily remixed for its single release. "Natural" peaked at number six on the UK Singles Chart and briefly charted in Germany and the Flanders region of Belgium.

Critical reception
A reviewer from Music Week rated the song three out of five, adding, "More reggae-lite from the impeccably pecced Aussie. His huge fanbase should guarantee another Top 10."

Track listings
 UK CD1
 "Natural" (radio edit) – 3:41
 "Natural" (Soulcity mix) – 3:43
 "You Are" (unplugged) – 3:45
 "Natural" (James Khari mix) – 3:56

 UK CD2
 "Natural" (radio edit) – 3:41
 "Natural" (C+J Street mix) – 4:19
 "Natural" (unplugged) – 3:51
 "I Feel You" (acoustic) – 5:38

 UK cassette single and European CD single
 "Natural" (radio edit) – 3:41
 "I Feel You" (unplugged) – 5:28

Charts

References

1995 songs
1997 singles
Mushroom Records singles
Peter Andre songs
Song recordings produced by Cutfather & Joe
Songs written by Glen Goldsmith
Songs written by Peter Andre